The Tomb of Horrors is a 2002 fantasy novel by Keith Strohm, set in the world of Greyhawk, and based on the Dungeons & Dragons role-playing game, specifically the adventure S1 Tomb of Horrors.

Plot summary
Kaerion, a fallen paladin, is recruited by a group of adventurers to help them explore the legendary Tomb of Horrors. In addition to confronting the tomb's architect, the evil demilich Acererak, the party also finds themselves opposed by a group of evil adventurers.

Development
In 1999, order to recognize the 25th anniversary of Dungeons  & Dragons, Wizards of the Coast published the "Greyhawk Classics", a series of seven novels based on well-known D&D adventures published by TSR during the game's first decade: Against the Giants (1999), White Plume Mountain (1999), Descent into the Depths of the Earth (2000), The Temple of Elemental Evil (2001), Queen of the Demonweb Pits (2001), The Tomb of Horrors, Keep on the Borderlands, and finally, The Tomb of Horrors, a 310-page paperback written Keith Francis Strohm and published in 2002.

Reviews
Review by Don D'Ammassa (2002) in Science Fiction Chronicle, #224 May 2002

References

2002 novels
Greyhawk novels